The 1997–98 Tetley's Bitter Rugby Union County Championship was the 98th edition of England's County Championship rugby union club competition. 

Cheshire won their third title after defeating Cornwall in the final.

Final

See also
 English rugby union system
 Rugby union in England

References

Rugby Union County Championship
County Championship (rugby union) seasons